Opium Moon is a new-age musical ensemble based in Los Angeles, California, United States. Its members are Hamid Saeidi, who plays the santur, violinist Lili Haydn, percussionist MB Gordy, and bassist Itai Disraeli. The works of Persian poet Hafez influence the group's style of improvisation.

History 

In an interview with San Francisco Classical Voice, Lili Haydn spoke about why she formed Opium Moon with Itai Disraeli:

In 2018, Opium Moon released their self-titled debut album through the record label Be Why Music. Steven Mirken in the Jewish Journal wrote that "Touches of jazz, rock, Middle Eastern and African sounds flit about" in their music, "but it never settles on a specific sound"; Priya Pathiyan in Hindustan Times called it "bliss inducing" and "so eclectic, it’s hard to categorise". The album later received the Grammy Award for Best New Age Album at the 61st Annual Grammy Awards.

Their second album Night + Day (2021) is composed of two song cycles, with six songs each, that model the passage of time in a day. Strings magazine praised the group's "silky and sensual" sound in their review of the album, as well as Gordy's "treasure trove" of Middle East percussion and Haydn's electrical violin. Night + Day was nominated for the same award for the 64th Annual Grammy Awards in 2022.

Musical style and influences 
The name Opium Moon and the group's "organic" improvisational style are inspired by the work of the Persian poet Hafez.

Three of the group's members are immigrants—from Iran, Israel, and Canada. According to Haydn, the global refugee crisis is an issue that is personally important to each of them; the song "Caravan" from their debut album is inspired by the immigrants they see in the news and through daily life.

Discography
 Opium Moon (Be Why Music, 2018)
 Night + Day (2021)

References

External links

Grammy Award winners
Musical groups from Los Angeles
New-age music groups
Musical quartets